The women's 4×100 metre freestyle relay took place on 14 August at the Olympic Aquatic Centre of the Athens Olympic Sports Complex in Athens, Greece.

For the first time in 48 years, the Australians (Alice Mills, Lisbeth Lenton, Petria Thomas, and Jodie Henry) overhauled the Team USA on the final leg to win a gold medal in the event. When Henry touched the wall at 3:35.94, the Australians broke a new world record under a 0.06-second mark set by the Germans in 2002 (3:36.00). Henry also unleashed a remarkable relay split of 52.95, the fastest of all-time in Olympic history.

The U.S. team of Kara Lynn Joyce, Natalie Coughlin, Amanda Weir, and Jenny Thompson finished out an American record of 3:36.39 to earn a silver medal, while the Dutch took home the bronze in 3:37.59, after Inge de Bruijn swam a split of 53.37 to hold off the Germans anchored by Franziska van Almsick.

Records
Prior to this competition, the existing world and Olympic records were as follows.

The following new world and Olympic records were set during this competition.

Results

Heats

Final

References

External links
Official Olympic Report

W
2004 in women's swimming
Women's events at the 2004 Summer Olympics